The 36th Primetime Emmy Awards were held on September 23, 1984. The ceremony was broadcast on CBS, from the Pasadena Civic Auditorium, Pasadena, California.

The top shows of the night were Cheers and Hill Street Blues. Cheers won its second straight Emmy for Outstanding Comedy Series, while Hill Street Blues made history. It became the first show to win the Emmy for Outstanding Drama Series four times. This record still stands today, but has been tied by L.A. Law, The West Wing, Mad Men and Game of Thrones. Hill Street Blues also added to another streak. It received at least 14 major nominations for the fourth straight year, winning four. Cheers received the most nominations on the comedy side (10), winning three.

Sir Laurence Olivier won the last of his five career Emmys this evening. His win was also the last time a non-Network Syndicated performance won an Acting Award.

Winners and nominees

Programs

Acting

Lead performances

Supporting performances

Directing

Writing

Most major nominations
By network 
 NBC – 53
 CBS – 37
 ABC – 27

 By program
 Hill Street Blues (NBC) – 14
 Fame (Syndicated) – 12
 Cheers (NBC) – 10
 St. Elsewhere (NBC) – 9
 Buffalo Bill (NBC) / Something About Amelia (ABC) – 6

Most major awards
By network 
 NBC – 10
 CBS – 7
 ABC – 5

 By program
 Hill Street Blues (NBC) – 4
 Cheers (NBC) / Something About Amelia (ABC) – 3

Notes

References

External links
 Emmys.com list of 1984 Nominees & Winners
 

036
1984 television awards
1984 in California
September 1984 events in the United States